Islamic Sciences and Culture Academy (ISCA) is a scientific and research academy for issues in Islamic sciences. It is affiliated to the Islamic Propagation Office of Qom seminary. This academy together with Baqir al-'Ulum University form research and education departments of the Islamic Propagation Office of the  seminary. Najaf Lakzaee,  lecturer of political studies and the research deputy of the Islamic Propagation Office of Qom seminary, is the president of the  Academy.

History
This academy used to be the research department of the Islamic Propagation Office of Qom seminary. In the new structure approved in 2001, it was decided to organize all research academies and institutes under one center. Finally, in 2005 in the supreme council for expansion of the ministry of Science, Research and Technology, four research centers were approved and the license of the Islamic Sciences and Culture Academy was granted.

Goals
Goals
 Explicating pure knowledge of Islam and refining religious culture from dogmatism and eclecticism.
 The systematic explication of Islam and presenting efficient individual and social models appropriate for the needs of contemporary world through development, cogitation and empowerment of Islamic sciences.
 Provision of scientific support for systematization and efficiency of religious government and Islamic Revolution.

Academy's Approach
Islamic Sciences and Culture Academy has considered and highlighted the problem-oriented approach to meet the needs and problems of the target community. The research activities of the academy to implement the above-mentioned approach are organized in 4 main centers and 13 specialized departments. The 4 main centers are:

 Center for Theoretical and the Solid System of Islamic and Human Sciences
 Center for Deepening Religious Faith and Fighting against Deviant Movements and Sects
 Center for Ethics, Family and Lifestyle
 Center for Political and Social System of Islam and Iran

Research Centers and Centers

 Research Center for Ahlulbayt History and Conducts 
 Research Centers for Political Sciences and Thought
 Research Centers for Fiqh(Islamic Jurisprudence) and Law
 Research Centers for Islamic Philosophy and Theology
 Research Center for Mahdiism and Future Studies (Futurology)
 Research Center for Islamic Documents and Information Management

 Research Center for Quranic Sciences and Culture
 Research Center for Ethics and Spirituality
 Research Center for Civilizational Islam
 Research Center for Theology and Family
 Center for Reviving of Islamic Works
 Center for Islamic Studies of Society and Civilization

Research Departments

Research Departments
Organizing Information & Documents
Information and Knowledge Dissemination
Comparative Theology
Social Ethics
Family Studies
Codicology Bibliography and Islamic Works Revival and Correction 
Civilizational Studies
Socio-cultural Studies
Jurisprudential and Legal Issues
Applied Jurisprudence
Wisdom and New Theology
Qur'an and Social Studies
Islamic Art and Civilization
Political Philosophy
Political Jurisprudence
Political Sciences
Compilation of Knowledge Structures
The Study of Mahdiism movements

Religion Futurology and Religiosity
Philosophy 
Theology
Philosophy of Ethics
Ethics
Education
Islam and Spirituality Studies
The Philosophy of Jurisprudence and Law
Jurisprudence-related knowledge
Encyclopedias
Dictionaries
Exegesis of the Holy Qur'an
Qur'anic Sciences
Comparative Studies
Shiite History
Conduct of Ahlulbayt (Peace be upon them)
Islamic Culture and Civilization 
The Encyclopedia of Ahlulbayt (Peace be upon them)
Mahdiism studies
studies of social justice

Faculty Members and Researchers
Number of full-time faculty members: more than 100 
Number of part-time faculty members: 7 
Number of full-time researchers: more than 40
Number of project-based researchers: more than 300

Research Plans 
Published: 858 research plans
In progress: 591 research plans

Some of the Most Important Research Plans
Encyclopedias
Published: 10

In progress: 11

Thesauruses
Published: 11

In progress: 6

Lexicons
Published: 13

In progress: 4

Mawsu'ats (A series of works)
Published: 9

In progress: 10

Macro-Projects
Published: 36

In progress: 34

Translations
41 volumes in partnership with Center of Civilization for Islamic Thought Development, Islamic Culture and Relations Organization, Dar Al maaref Alhikmiah and Al-Hadaf Center.

Libraries 
Number of libraries: Nine libraries. One of the libraries is the digital library with 100 digital references.

Number of books: 235,500 titles and 383,091 volumes

Publications 
1184 volumes (596 volumes in ISCA's Press, 471 volumes in Bustan Kitab Press, 112 volumes in Isfahan Branch Press and 5 works in partnership with Samt Publication).

Electronic Publishing
Over 3500 books and journals from prominent national and international publishers.
Publishing all the books and journals of ISCA and Islamic Propagation Office of Qom Seminary simultaneously in Pajoohaan Mobile Bookreader.
www.pajoohaan.ir

Journals
14 journals

Pajooheshhaye Qur'ani (Qur'anic Research)
Islam wa Motaleaate Ijtemaeie (Islam and Social Studies)
Motale'ate Siasi Eslami (Political- Islamic Studies) in English and Arabic
Kavoshi No Dar Fiqh (A New Exploration in Jurisprudence)
Naqd va Nazar (Review and Comment)
Pajooheshhaye Aqli Novin(new intellectual research)
Akhlaq (Ethics)
Howzeh
Modiriate Daneshe Eslami( Islamic Knowledge Management)
Motaleate Adabie Motoone Eslami (Literary Studies of Islamic Texts) 
Sirah Pajoohi Ahl al- Bayt ( studies on conduct of Ahl al- Bayt)
Noqalam
Ayeneh-E-Pazhoohesh (Mirror of Research)
Journal of Islam's Political Studies (in English)

http://journals.isca.ac.ir

Websites and Software Products
The Comprehensive Portal for Quranic Sciences and Knowledge
Islamic Sciences Information Management System
The Portal of Journals
The Digital Library
The Encyclopedia of Ahlul al-Bayt (pbut)
Islamic Sciences Wiki
http://apps.isca.ac.ir

Mobile Applications
Quran Siraj 
The Encyclopedia of the Holy Quran
The Dictionary of the Holy Quran
Quranic Questions
Pajoohaan Bookreader
Thematic Dictionaries and Encyclopedias of the Qur'an in 20 topics (Resistance, progress model, ethics, family, politics, security and information, history and A'alam, jurisprudence and law, spirituality, art, Islamic theology, jihad and martyrdom, social and civilizational studies, management, environment, The second Phase of the Revolution of Iran, economy, hajj, ifaf and hijab, health).

Scientific Sessions and Meetings
Critical and promotional sessions:  502 sessions  
Scientific meetings:  1534 meetings
Specialized sessions:  3 sessions

Conferences
International Conferences:  19 conferences  
National Conferences:  46 conferences

Scientific Cooperation
Number of National and International Scientific Cooperation: 138

Memorandums of understanding
National MoUs: 96   
International MoUs: 12

Board of Honors
Top research institute in the 4th Farabi International Festival  
The selected Publisher in 8 rounds of Islamic Republic of Iran Seminary Year Book Festival
Gaining the first place in holding critical and promotional sessions among educational and research centers and institutes in 2017
Number of selected works in Farabi International Festival:  5 works  
Number of selected works in Islamic Republic of Iran Year Book Festival: 17 works

Other Festivals
More than 200 works have been selected in different festivals including, Seminary Year Book, Congress of Religion Researchers, Islamic Republic of Iran Season Book, University Student Year Book and so on.

Notes

References

www.isca.ac.ir/en

www.isca.ac.ir

2005 establishments in Iran
Research institutes established in 2005
Research institutes in Iran